Hochspeyer is a municipality in the district of Kaiserslautern, in Rhineland-Palatinate, Germany. It is situated in the Palatinate forest (Pfälzer Wald), approx. 10 km east of Kaiserslautern.

Hochspeyer was the seat of the former Verbandsgemeinde Hochspeyer ("collective municipality").

History
Hochspeyer's history is closely related to the Cistercian Abbey of Otterberg, to which the Münchhof belonged since 1195.

In 1801 the region Palatinate became part of the French Département Mont-Tonnerre, and in 1815 it became part of the Bavarian Kingdom.

After World War II Palatinate (and with it Hochspeyer) was incorporated in the federal state of Rhineland-Palatinate.

Education
Hochspeyer has the Münchhofschule (a primary and secondary school) as well as three Kindergartens.

Economy
Trade, minor industry and farming shape the small local economy in Hochspeyer. Tourism is about to develop since the Palatinate forest has become part of the biosphere reserve Pfälzer Wald-Vosges du Nord in 1998 and projects like the Mountainbikepark Pfälzerwald, a route network for mountainbiking, have been initiated.

Transport
Hochspeyer is near the A6 and A63 motorways. It is also served by the B37 and B49 roads.

For rail, Hochspeyer is served by RheinNeckar S-Bahn trains on the Saarbrücken–Mannheim line between Kaiserslautern/Homburg and Mannheim/Heidelberg half-hourly.

Climate
Climate in this area has mild differences between highs and lows, and there is adequate rainfall year-round.  The Köppen Climate Classification subtype for this climate is "Cfb" (Marine West Coast Climate/Oceanic climate).

Notable people
Johannes Böhm (1890–1957), politician (SPD)
Wilhelm Moschel (1896–1954), chemist
Karl Ritter (1916–1994), politician (SPD)
Hugo Ohliger (1920–1999), politician (CSU)
Peter Schwarz (born 1953), football player

References

External links
Hochspeyer Web Site Tourism and Community Town site

Palatinate Forest
Kaiserslautern (district)